R. Keith McCormick (born June 17, 1954) is an American modern pentathlete and U.S. Army veteran who represented the United States at the 1976 Summer Olympics, as an alternate. He finished second in the Junior World Championships in 1973, won the North American Pentathlon Championships in 1975, and briefly held the American record for points scored in the Modern Pentathlon. He was considered a contender to win the gold medal in 1980, when the United States boycotted the Olympics because of Russia's invasion of Afghanistan.

Early life and education
McCormick was born in Waynesboro, Pennsylvania and later earned his bachelor's degree in Human Biology at Stanford University and his doctorate at the National College of Chiropractic. While at Stanford, McCormick competed on the cross-country and fencing teams and also competed in the World Modern Pentathlon Championships during his junior year.

Professional career
Since 1982 McCormick has been a Doctor of Chiropractic in the states of Massachusetts, Colorado, and California. McCormick is also a Sports Chiropractic Physician who treats collegiate, high school and recreational athletes in Western Massachusetts. He  is a certified chiropractic sports physician and author of the 2009 book The Whole-Body Approach to Osteoporosis.

As a response to his personal history with severe osteoporosis, McCormick founded OsteoNaturals, LLC to develop supplements that could provide therapeutic levels of effective ingredients to target bone health.

Publications

Books
 The Whole-Body Approach to Osteoporosis (New Harbinger Publications, 2009)

Journals
 Osteoporosis: Integrating Biomarkers and Other Diagnostic Correlates into the Management of Bone Fragility (Alternative Medicine Review Volume 12, Number 2 2007)

Private life
McCormick continues to compete in triathlons in all distances including Ironman Triathlons. McCormick placed 7th in his age group in the 2010 and 9th in his age group in 2011 70.3 Ironman Triathlon World Championships. His son is the journalist and author Ty McCormick.

Modern pentathlon accomplishments

References 

1954 births
Living people
American male modern pentathletes
American chiropractors
People from Belchertown, Massachusetts
People from Waynesboro, Pennsylvania
National University of Health Sciences alumni
Sportspeople from Hampshire County, Massachusetts